Blöndal is an Icelandic surname. Notable people with the surname include:

 Auðunn Blöndal (born 1980), Icelandic television personality, actor, and comedian
 Björn Blöndal (1787–1846), Icelandic District Commissioner (sýslumaður) and politician
 Halldór Blöndal (born 1938), Icelandic politician of the Icelandic Independence Party
 Lárus Blöndal (1836–1894), Icelandic sýslumaður and alþingismaður
 Pétur Blöndal (1944–2015), Icelandic parliamentarian of the Icelandic Independence Party
 Sigfús Blöndal (1874–1950), Icelandic language author and librarian
 Sölvi Blöndal (born 1975), member of Icelandic rap rock band Quarashi